Comet Falls is a tall waterfall located on Van Trump Creek in Pierce County, Washington.  The falls are thought to be the best in the Mount Rainier region.

Stature 

At first glance the falls drop about  out of a hanging valley in one lofty plunge. The height of the plunge is actually . The falls are more than that though, as there are two obvious smaller tiers below the main drop as well as one just visible above the main drop.

Debris Flow of 2001

Due to the strong bedrock the falls flow over, the falls themselves were not damaged, but the mudflows still left their mark. Also, the pool at the base of the main drop was filled in by rock and debris.

Floods of 2003 and 2006 

The floods of 2003 and 2006 actually helped the falls a lot because it removed most of the debris that previously lined the creek below the falls.  Once again, due to the strong bedrock the falls flow over, the falls were not altered much.

References 

Mount Rainier National Park
Waterfalls of Pierce County, Washington
Waterfalls of Washington (state)
Plunge waterfalls